Mihael Mihalev (born 7 April 1990 in Provadia) is a Bulgarian footballer who plays for Spartak Varna as a defender.

He comes directly from Spartak's Youth Academy.

References

External links
 Profile at spartak1918.com

1990 births
Living people
Bulgarian footballers
Association football defenders
First Professional Football League (Bulgaria) players
PFC Spartak Varna players